The Reikorangi Stream is a stream on the Kapiti Coast of New Zealand's North Island. It is one of the Waikanae River's major tributaries.  Its headwaters are in the Tararua Ranges near Maungakotukutuku, and it flows north to Reikorangi in the Akatarawa Valley, where it meets the Waikanae River.

References

Rivers of the Wellington Region
Rivers of New Zealand